Třebovle is a municipality and village in Kolín District in the Central Bohemian Region of the Czech Republic. It has about 600 inhabitants.

Administrative parts
Villages of Borek, Království and Miškovice are administrative parts of Třebovle.

References

Villages in Kolín District